Emmanuel Hostache (sometimes shown as Emanuel Hostache, 18 July 1975 in La Mure, Isère – 30 May 2007) was a French bobsledder who competed from 1991 to 2000. Competing in two Winter Olympics, he won a bronze medal in the four-man event (tied with Great Britain) at Nagano in 1998. Hostache was born at La Mure, in south-eastern France.

At the 1999 FIBT World Championships in Cortina d'Ampezzo, Hostache won a gold in the four-man event and a bronze in the two-man event.

Prior to being a bobsledder, Hostache also competed as a track and field athlete in the shot put and discus throw events.

Hostache died of Ewing's sarcoma in 2007 after fighting the disease for eight years.

References

External links
Bobsleigh four-man Olympic medalists for 1924, 1932-56, and since 1964
Bobsleigh two-man world championship medalists since 1931
Bobsleigh four-man world championship medalists since 1930
 DatabaseOlympics.com profile
 FIBT profile
 French Athletic Federation news of Hostache's death 

1975 births
2007 deaths
People from La Mure
Bobsledders at the 1998 Winter Olympics
Bobsledders at the 2002 Winter Olympics
French male shot putters
French male discus throwers
French male bobsledders
Olympic bobsledders of France
Olympic bronze medalists for France
Olympic medalists in bobsleigh
Medalists at the 1998 Winter Olympics
Deaths from bone cancer
Sportspeople from Isère